Health regions, also called health authorities, are a governance model used by Canada's provincial and territorial governments to administer and deliver public health care to all Canadian residents.

Health care is designated a provincial responsibility under the separation of powers in Canada's federal system. Most health regions or health authorities are organized along geographic boundaries, however, some are organized along operational lines.

Atlantic region 
New Brunswick
 Vitalité Health Network
 Horizon Health Network
Newfoundland and Labrador
 Central Health
 Eastern Health
 Labrador-Grenfell Health
 Western Health
Nova Scotia
 IWK Health Centre
 Nova Scotia Health Authority
Prince Edward Island
 Health PEI is the single health authority for the province

British Columbia 
 Northern Health
 Interior Health
 Island Health
 Vancouver Coastal Health
 Fraser Health
 First Nations Health Authority (not regional)
 Provincial Health Services Authority (not regional - serves entire province)

Ontario 
 Erie St. Clair LHIN
 South West LHIN
 Waterloo Wellington LHIN
 Hamilton Niagara Haldimand Brant LHIN
 Central West LHIN
 Mississauga Halton LHIN
 Toronto Central LHIN
 Central LHIN
 Central East LHIN
 South East LHIN
 Champlain LHIN
 North Simcoe Muskoka LHIN
 North East LHIN
 North West LHIN

Prairie region 
Alberta
 Alberta Health Services is the single health authority for the province, it was created in 2008 from nine former regional health authorities (RHAs) plus the Alberta Mental Health Board, the Alberta Cancer Board, and the Alberta Alcohol and Drug Abuse Commission. The RHAs were in turn created in 1994, from the former hospital boards and local health units.
Manitoba
 Interlake-Eastern Regional Health Authority
 Northern Regional Health Authority
 Southern Health-Santé Sud
 Prairie Mountain Health
 Winnipeg Regional Health Authority
Saskatchewan
Saskatchewan Health Authority, the single health authority of Saskatchewan as of December 4, 2017.

Quebec 
 Région de l’Abitibi-Témiscamingue
 Région de l’Estrie
 Région de l’Outaouais
 Région de la Capitale-Nationale
 Région de la Chaudière-Appalaches
 Région de la Côte-Nord
 Région de la Gaspésie-Îles-de-la-Madeleine
 Région de la Mauricie et du Centre-du-Québec
 Région de la Montérégie
 Région de Lanaudière
 Région de Laval
 Région de Montréal-Centre
 Région des Laurentides
 Région des Terres-Cries-de-la-Baie-James
 Région du Bas-Saint-Laurent
 Région du Nord-du-Québec
 Région du Nunavik
 Région du Saguenay - Lac-Saint-Jean

Territories 
Northwest Territories
 Beaufort-Delta HSS Authority
 Sahtu HSS Authority
 Deh Cho HSS Authority
 Tlicho HSS Authority
 Yellowknife HSS Authority
 Stanton Territorial Health Authority
 Hay River HSS Authority
 Fort Smith HSS Authority
Nunavut
 Nunavut Health Region
Yukon Territory
 Yukon Territory Health Region

See also
Health care in Canada

External links
 List of health regions published by Statistics Canada and CIHI

References

 
Lists of organizations based in Canada
Regions
Regions of Canada